Waratto (died 686) was the mayor of the palace of Neustria and Burgundy on two occasions, owing to the deposition he experienced at the hands of his own faithless son.  His first term lasted from 680 or 681 (the death of Ebroin) to 682, when his son Gistemar (or Ghislemar) deposed him and took over the office.  However, Waratton soon reestablished himself and continued to reign until his death in 684 or 686.  He made peace between the three Frankish kingdoms and with Pepin of Heristal in 681. His daughter Anstrude later married Duke Drogo of Champagne, Pepin's eldest son.

He married Ansflede and had the two aforementioned children:

Gistemar (d. 684), mayor of the palace of Neustria and Burgundy (682)
Anstrude, married firstly Berchar, mayor of the palace of Neustria and Burgundy (684-687), married secondly Drogo of Champagne

686 deaths
Mayors of the Palace
Year of birth unknown